Eucalyptus howittiana, commonly known as Howitt's box, is a species of tree that is endemic to a small area of Queensland. It has rough, fibrous and flaky bark on the trunk and branches, lance-shaped or egg-shaped adult leaves, flower buds in groups of between seven and eleven, creamy white flowers and shortened spherical to barrel-shaped fruit.

Description
It has rough, grey coloured bark that is shortly fibrous and flaky, often fissured to tessellated on older trunks. Flowering occurs between January and May and the flowers are creamy white.

Taxonomy and naming
Eucalyptus howittiana was first formally described in 1882 by the botanist Ferdinand von Mueller in The Southern Science Record. The specific epithet honours the bushman, explorer, botanist, geologist and magistrate, Alfred William Howitt.

Distribution and habitat
It grows in skeletal sandy, well-drained soils on rocky escarpments and slopes on a variety of substrates. It is a part of woodland communities usually with other eucalypts or sometimes on the boundary of semi-deciduous vine thickets.

Conservation status
This eucalypt is classified as "least concern" under the Queensland Government Nature Conservation Act 1992.

See also
List of Eucalyptus species

References

Trees of Australia
howittiana
Myrtales of Australia
Flora of Queensland
Plants described in 1882
Taxa named by Ferdinand von Mueller